Sara Georgini is an American historian, and series editor for The Papers of John Adams, at the Adams Papers Editorial Project which is headquartered at the Massachusetts Historical Society.

She graduated from Boston University receiving her doctorate in 2016.

Georgini's 2019 book, Household Gods, examines the development of American religious ideas through the lens of John Adams' family. It focuses on white, Protestant religious thought, specifically through the British tradition. She proposes that the family's extensive travel was critical to shaping their religious practice, and that the men of the family were intent on incorporating their family history into the emerging national myth. In reviewing the book, Johnson praises the book's ambition, but criticizes its focus only on the men of the family, and its inaccessibility to non-experts.

Her work has appeared in Smithsonian magazine. She is a member of the Junto, a group blog about the founding of Early America.

Works 
 Household Gods: The Religious Lives of the Adams Family (Oxford University Press, 2019). Reviews:

References

External links 
https://www.c-span.org/person/?sarageorgini
https://www.masshist.org/about/staff
https://earlyamericanists.com/members/sara-georgini/

American women historians
Living people
Year of birth missing (living people)
21st-century American women